Mohamed Hafez El-Sayed (born 19 November 1963) is an Egyptian weightlifter. He competed in the men's flyweight event at the 1984 Summer Olympics.

References

External links
 

1963 births
Living people
Egyptian male weightlifters
Olympic weightlifters of Egypt
Weightlifters at the 1984 Summer Olympics
Place of birth missing (living people)